Edmondson's pipefish (Halicampus edmondsoni) is a species of marine fish of the family Syngnathidae. Although this species' feeding habits are unknown, it is expected to feed on small crustaceans similar to other pipefishes. This species is ovoviviparous, with males carrying eggs in a brood pouch before giving birth to live young.

Etyology
The fish is named in honor of biologist Charles Howard Edmondson of the Bishop Museum in Honolulu, who helped Pietschmann with his work and also collected the type specimen.

References

Further reading

WoRMS
ZipcodeZoo

edmondsoni
Fish of Hawaii
Endemic fauna of Hawaii
Fish described in 1913
Taxa named by Viktor Pietschmann